Valdeobispo is a municipality located in the province of Cáceres, in the autonomous community of Extremadura, Spain. 
According to the 2014 census, the municipality has a population of 705 inhabitants.

References

External links
 
Extended information about history, traditions, interesting places, music, gastronomy, ancient pictures and much more (in Spanish)

 auto

Municipalities in the Province of Cáceres